Ulzyte (Ülzyte) is a rural locality (a selo) in Kizhinginsky District, Republic of Buryatia, Russia. The population was 316 as of 2010. There are 4 streets.

Geography 
Ulzyte is located 24 km northeast of Kizhinga (the district's administrative centre) by road. Innokentyevka is the nearest rural locality.

References 

Rural localities in Kizhinginsky District